Lucius Julius Caesar may refer to:

 Lucius Julius Caesar (consul 90 BC), Roman senator, killed by Gaius Marius
 Lucius Julius Caesar (consul 64 BC), Roman senator, uncle of Mark Antony
 Lucius Julius Caesar (praetor 183 BC)
 Lucius Julius Caesar (proquaestor) (died 46 BC), son of the consul in 64
 Lucius Caesar (17 BC – 2 AD), grandson of Augustus

See also

 
 Julii Caesares
 Lucius Julius (disambiguation)